Malinki is a rural locality (a village) in Posyolok Zolotkovo, Gus-Khrustalny District, Vladimir Oblast, Russia. The population was 38 as of 2010.

Geography 
Malinki is located 46 km southeast of Gus-Khrustalny (the district's administrative centre) by road. Zolotkovsky is the nearest rural locality.

References 

Rural localities in Gus-Khrustalny District